Tropical cyclones are non-frontal, low-pressure systems that develop, within an environment of warm sea surface temperatures and little vertical wind shear aloft. Within the South Pacific, names are assigned from a pre-determined list, to such systems, once they reach or exceed ten-minute sustained wind speeds of 65 km/h (40 mph), near the center, by either the Fiji Meteorological Service or New Zealand's MetService. Within the South Pacific, tropical cyclones have been officially named since the 1964–65 South Pacific cyclone season, though a few meteorological papers show that a few tropical cyclones were named before 1964–65. The names of significant tropical cyclones that have caused a high amount of damage and/or caused a significant number of deaths are retired from the lists of tropical cyclone names by the World Meteorological Organization's RA V Tropical Cyclone Committee at their bi-annual meeting.

Within the South Pacific, there have been a total of 103 tropical cyclone names retired, with the 1990s having the most retired tropical cyclone names. The deadliest tropical cyclone to have its name retired was Severe Tropical Cyclone Namu, which caused over 100 deaths, when it affected the Solomon Islands in May 1986.

Background

Within the region the credit for the first usage of personal names for weather systems, is generally given to the Queensland Government Meteorologist Clement Wragge, who named systems between 1887 and 1907. Wragge used names drawn from the letters of the Greek alphabet, Greek and Roman mythology and female names, to describe weather systems over Australia, New Zealand and the Antarctic. After the new Australian government had failed to create a federal weather bureau and appoint him director, Wragge started naming cyclones after political figures. This system of naming weather systems in the region subsequently fell into disuse for several years after Wragge retired, until it was revived by the New Caledonia Meteorological Office during the 1958–59 cyclone season. During the 1963–64 cyclone season the Australian Bureau of Meteorology started to use female names for tropical cyclones that occurred within the Australian region, before the New Zealand Meteorological Service's Fiji office also started using female names for tropical cyclones within the South Pacific during the 1969–70 cyclone season. During the International Women's Year of 1975 the NZMS decided to incorporate male names into the naming lists for the South Pacific, following a request from the Fiji National Council of Women who considered the practice discrimination. At around the same time the Australian Science Minister ordered that tropical cyclones, within the Australian region should carry both men's and women's names. This was because the minister thought "that both sexes should bear the odium of the devastation caused by cyclones." As a result, male names were added to the lists of names for both basins, ahead of the 1975–76 season.

Later that decade as the dual sex naming of tropical cyclones started in the Northern Hemisphere, the NZMS looked at adding ethnic Pacific names to the naming lists rather than the European names that were currently used. As a result of the many languages and cultures in the Pacific there was a lot of discussion surrounding this matter, with one name "Oni" being dropped as it meant the end of the world in one language. One proposal suggested that cyclones be named from the country nearest to which they formed, however, this was dropped when it was realized that a cyclone might be less destructive in its formative stage than later in its development. Eventually it was decided to throw names from all over the South Pacific into a pot at a training course, where each course member provided a list of names that were short, easily pronounced, culturally acceptable throughout the Pacific and did not contain any idiosyncrasies. These names were then collated, edited for suitability before being cross-checked with the group for acceptability. It was intended that the four lists of names should be alphabetical with alternative male and female names while using only ethnic names, however, it was not possible to complete the lists using only ethnic names so some European names were added in. As a result, there was a scattering of European names in the final naming lists, which have been used by the Fiji Meteorological Service and NZMS since the 1980–81 season.

The practice of retiring significant names was started during 1955 by the United States Weather Bureau in the Northern Atlantic basin, after hurricanes Carol, Edna, and Hazel struck the Northeastern United States and caused a significant amount of damage in the previous year. Initially the names were only designed to be retired for ten years after which they might be reintroduced, however, it was decided at the 1969 Interdepartmental hurricane conference, that any significant hurricane in the future would have its name permanently retired. The first tropical cyclone name to be removed in the South Pacific, was Rosie after it had impacted Vanuatu and New Caledonia during 1971. Several names have been removed from the Pacific naming lists for various other reasons than causing a significant amount of death/destruction, which include being pronounced in a very similar way to other names and  political reasons.

Systems

|-
| Rosie ||  || bgcolor=#| || bgcolor=#| || bgcolor=#| || Vanuatu, New Caledonia, New Zealand ||  ||  ||
|-
| Vivienne ||  || bgcolor=#| || bgcolor=#| || bgcolor=#| || French Polynesia ||  ||  ||
|-
| Carlotta ||  || bgcolor=#| || bgcolor=#| || bgcolor=#| || Solomon Islands, New CaledoniaVanuatu || Unknown ||  ||
|-
| Wendy ||  || bgcolor=#| || bgcolor=#| || bgcolor=#| || New Caledonia, Vanuatu || Unknown ||  ||
|-
| Agatha ||  || bgcolor=#| || bgcolor=#| || bgcolor=#| || Cook Islands || Unknown ||  ||
|-
| Bebe ||  || bgcolor=#| || bgcolor=#| || bgcolor=#| || Fiji, Tuvalu ||  ||  ||
|-
| Lottie ||  || bgcolor=#| || bgcolor=#| || bgcolor=#| || Fiji, Tonga ||  ||  ||
|-
| Tina ||  || bgcolor=#| || bgcolor=#| || bgcolor=#| || Fiji, Tonga ||  ||  ||
|-
| Alison ||  || bgcolor=#| || bgcolor=#| || bgcolor=#| || New Caledonia, New ZealandVanuatu ||  ||  ||
|-
| David ||  || bgcolor=#| || bgcolor=#| || bgcolor=#| || Queensland || N/A ||  ||
|-
| Elsa ||  || bgcolor=#| || bgcolor=#| || bgcolor=#| || New Caledonia, Vanuatu ||  ||  ||
|-
| Marion ||  || bgcolor=#| || bgcolor=#| || bgcolor=#| || Vanuatu || Unknown ||  ||
|-
| Robert ||  || bgcolor=#| || bgcolor=#| || bgcolor=#| || French Polynesia || Unknown ||  || 
|-
| Bob ||  || bgcolor=#| || bgcolor=#| || bgcolor=#| ||Fiji, New CaledoniaVanuatu, New Zealand ||  ||  ||
|-
| Charles ||  || bgcolor=#| || bgcolor=#| || bgcolor=#| || Samoan Islands || Unknown ||  ||
|-
| Diana ||  ||  bgcolor=#| || bgcolor=#| || bgcolor=#| || French Polynesia || Unknown ||  ||
|-
| Fay ||  || bgcolor=#| || bgcolor=#| || bgcolor=#| || Fiji ||  ||  ||
|-
| Gordon ||  || bgcolor=#| || bgcolor=#| || bgcolor=#| || Australia, New CaledoniaVanuatu ||  ||  ||
|-
| Kerry ||  || bgcolor=#| || bgcolor=#| || bgcolor=#| || Australia, Solomon Islands || Unknown ||  ||
|-
| Meli ||  || bgcolor=#| || bgcolor=#| || bgcolor=#| || Fiji ||  ||  ||
|-
| Wally ||  || bgcolor=#| || bgcolor=#| || bgcolor=#| || Fiji ||  ||  ||
|-
| Tahmar ||  || bgcolor=#| || bgcolor=#| || bgcolor=#| || French Polynesia || Unknown ||  ||
|-
| Gyan ||  || bgcolor=#| || bgcolor=#| || bgcolor=#| || Vanuatu || Unknown ||  ||
|-
| Isaac ||  || bgcolor=#| || bgcolor=#| || bgcolor=#| || Tonga ||  ||  ||
|-
| Joti ||  || bgcolor=#| || bgcolor=#| || bgcolor=#| || Vanuatu ||  ||  ||
|-
| Lisa ||  || bgcolor=#| || bgcolor=#| || bgcolor=#| || Cook Islands || Unknown ||  ||
|-
| Mark ||  || bgcolor=#| || bgcolor=#| || bgcolor=#| || Fiji || Unknown ||  ||
|-
| Oscar ||  || bgcolor=#| || bgcolor=#| || bgcolor=#| || Fiji ||  ||  ||
|-
| Veena ||  || bgcolor=#| || bgcolor=#| || bgcolor=#| || French Polynesia || Unknown ||  ||
|- 
| Eric ||  || bgcolor=#| || bgcolor=#| || bgcolor=#| || Fiji, Vanuatu ||   ||  || 
|-
| Ima ||  || bgcolor=#| || bgcolor=#| || bgcolor=#| || Cook Islands || Unknown ||  ||
|-
| Namu ||  || bgcolor=#| || bgcolor=#| || bgcolor=#| || Solomon Islands ||  ||  ||
|-
| Raja ||  || bgcolor=#| || bgcolor=#| || bgcolor=#| || Fiji, Tonga, TuvaluWallis and Futuna ||  ||  ||
|-
| Sally ||  || bgcolor=#| || bgcolor=#| || bgcolor=#| || Cook Islands, French Polynesia ||  ||  ||
|-
| Tusi ||  || bgcolor=#| || bgcolor=#| || bgcolor=#| || American Samoa ||  ||  ||
|-
| Uma ||  || bgcolor=#| || bgcolor=#| || bgcolor=#| || Vanuatu ||  ||  ||
|-
| Anne ||  || bgcolor=#| || bgcolor=#| || bgcolor=#| || New Caledonia, Vanuatu ||  ||  ||
|-
| Bola ||  || bgcolor=#| || bgcolor=#| || bgcolor=#| || Fiji, New Zealand, Vanuatu ||  ||  ||
|-
| Harry ||  || bgcolor=#| || bgcolor=#| || bgcolor=#| || New Caledonia || Unknown ||  ||
|-
| Lili ||  || bgcolor=#| || bgcolor=#| || bgcolor=#| || New Caledonia, Solomon IslandsVanuatu || Unknown ||  ||
|-
| Ofa ||  || bgcolor=#| || bgcolor=#| || bgcolor=#| || American Samoa, Niue, SamoaTokelau, Tonga, Tuvalu ||  ||  ||
|-
| Peni ||  || bgcolor=#| || bgcolor=#| || bgcolor=#| || Cook Islands ||  ||  ||
|-
| Sina ||  || bgcolor=#| || bgcolor=#|  || bgcolor=#| || Fiji, Niue, Cook Islands, Tonga ||  ||  ||
|-
| Tia ||  || bgcolor=#| || bgcolor=#| || bgcolor=#| || Solomon Islands, Vanuatu ||  ||  ||
|-
| Val ||  || bgcolor=#| || bgcolor=#| || bgcolor=#| || American Samoa, Cook IslandsSamoa, Tonga, TokelauTuvalu, Wallis and Futuna ||  ||  ||
|-
| Wasa ||  || bgcolor=#| || bgcolor=#| || bgcolor=#| || French Polynesia ||  ||  ||
|-
| Betsy ||  || bgcolor=#| || bgcolor=#| || bgcolor=#| || Vanuatu ||  ||  ||
|-
| Esau ||  || bgcolor=#| || bgcolor=#| || bgcolor=#| || Vanuatu ||  ||  ||
|-
| Fran ||  || bgcolor=#| || bgcolor=#| || bgcolor=#| || Fiji, New Caledonia, QueenslandVanuatu, Wallis and Futuna ||  ||  ||
|-
| Joni ||  || bgcolor=#| || bgcolor=#| || bgcolor=#| || Fiji, Tuvalu ||  ||  ||
|-
| Kina ||  || bgcolor=#| || bgcolor=#| || bgcolor=#| || Fiji, Tonga ||  ||  ||
|-
| Prema || || bgcolor=#| || bgcolor=#| || bgcolor=#| || New Caledonia, Vanuatu ||  ||  ||
|-
| Rewa ||  || bgcolor=#| || bgcolor=#| || bgcolor=#| || New Caledonia, New ZealandPapua New Guinea, QueenslandSolomon Islands, Vanuatu  || Unknown ||  ||
|-
| William ||  || bgcolor=#| || bgcolor=#| || bgcolor=#| || Cook Islands, French Polynesia ||  ||  ||
|-
| Beti ||  || bgcolor=#| || bgcolor=#| || bgcolor=#| || Australia, New CaledoniaNew Zealand, Vanuatu ||  ||  ||
|-
| Drena ||  || bgcolor=#| || bgcolor=#| || bgcolor=#| || New Caledonia, New ZealandVanuatu || Unknown ||  ||
|-
| Gavin ||  || bgcolor=#| || bgcolor=#| || bgcolor=#| || Fiji, Tuvalu, Wallis and Futuna ||  ||  ||
|-
| Hina ||  || bgcolor=#| || bgcolor=#| || bgcolor=#| || Fiji, Tonga, TuvaluWallis and Futuna ||  ||  ||
|-
| Keli ||  || bgcolor=#| || bgcolor=#| || bgcolor=#| || Tuvulu, Tonga, Wallis and Futuna ||  ||  ||
|-
| Martin ||  || bgcolor=#| || bgcolor=#| || bgcolor=#| || Cook Islands, French Polynesia ||  ||  ||
|-
| Osea ||  || bgcolor=#| || bgcolor=#| || bgcolor=#| || Cook Islands, French Polynesia || Unknown ||  ||
|-
| Ron ||  || bgcolor=#| || bgcolor=#| || bgcolor=#||| Niue, Tokelau, Tonga ||  ||  ||
|-
| Susan ||  || bgcolor=#| || bgcolor=#| || bgcolor=#||| Fiji, Solomon Islands, Vanuatu ||  ||  ||
|-
| Tui ||  || bgcolor=#| || bgcolor=#| || bgcolor=#| || Samoan islands ||  ||  ||
|-
| Ursula ||  ||  bgcolor=#| || bgcolor=#| || bgcolor=#| || French Polynesia ||  ||  ||
|-
| Veli ||  || bgcolor=#| || bgcolor=#| || bgcolor=#| || French Polynesia ||  ||  ||
|-
| Cora ||  || bgcolor=#| || bgcolor=#| || bgcolor=#| || Tonga ||  ||  ||
|-
| Dani ||  || bgcolor=#| || bgcolor=#| || bgcolor=#| || Fiji, New Caledonia, Vanuatu ||  ||  ||
|-
| Frank ||  || bgcolor=#| || bgcolor=#| || bgcolor=#| || New Caledonia || Unknown ||  ||
|-
| Kim ||  || bgcolor=#| || bgcolor=#| || bgcolor=#| || French Polynesia ||  ||  ||
|-
| Paula ||  || bgcolor=#| || bgcolor=#| || bgcolor=#| || Fiji, Tonga, Vanuatu ||  ||  ||
|-
| Sose ||  || bgcolor=#| || bgcolor=#| || bgcolor=#| || Australia, New Caledonia, Vanuatu || Unknown ||  ||
|-
| Trina ||  || bgcolor=#| || bgcolor=#| || bgcolor=#| || Cook Islands ||  ||  ||
|-
| Waka ||  || bgcolor=#| || bgcolor=#| || bgcolor=#| || Tonga, Wallis and Futuna ||  ||  ||
|-
| Zoe ||  || bgcolor=#| || bgcolor=#| || bgcolor=#| || Solomon Islands, Vanuatu ||  ||  ||
|-
| Ami ||  || bgcolor=#| || bgcolor=#| || bgcolor=#| || Fiji, Tonga, Tuvalu ||  ||  ||
|-
| Beni ||  || bgcolor=#| || bgcolor=#| || bgcolor=#| || Australia, New CaledoniaSolomon Islands, Vanuatu ||  ||  ||
|-
| Cilla ||  || bgcolor=#| || bgcolor=#| || bgcolor=#| || Tonga || Unknown ||  ||
|-
| Heta ||  || bgcolor=#| || bgcolor=#| || bgcolor=#| || American Samoa, Niue, SamoaTonga, Wallis and Futuna ||  ||  ||
|-
| Ivy ||  || bgcolor=#| || bgcolor=#| || bgcolor=#| || Vanuatu ||  ||  ||
|-
| Meena ||  || bgcolor=#| || bgcolor=#| || bgcolor=#| || Cook Islands ||  ||  ||
|-
| Nancy ||  || bgcolor=#| || bgcolor=#| || bgcolor=#| || Cook Islands ||  ||  ||
|-
| Olaf ||  || bgcolor=#| || bgcolor=#| || bgcolor=#| || American Samoa, Cook IslandsSamoa ||  ||  ||
|-
| Percy ||  || bgcolor=#| || bgcolor=#| || bgcolor=#| || American Samoa, Cook IslandsSamoa, Tokelau ||  ||  ||
|-
| Cliff ||  || bgcolor=#| || bgcolor=#| || bgcolor=#| || Fiji, Tonga ||  ||  ||
|-
| Daman ||  || bgcolor=#| || bgcolor=#|  || bgcolor=#| || Fiji, Tonga ||  ||  ||
|-
| Funa ||  || bgcolor=#| || bgcolor=#| || bgcolor=#| || Vanuatu ||  ||  ||
|-
| Gene ||  || bgcolor=#| || bgcolor=#| || bgcolor=#| || Fiji ||  ||  ||
|-
| Mick ||  || bgcolor=#| || bgcolor=#| || bgcolor=#| || Fiji ||  ||  ||
|-
| Oli ||  || bgcolor=#| || bgcolor=#| || bgcolor=#| || Cook Islands, French Polynesia ||  ||  ||
|-
| Pat ||  || bgcolor=#| || bgcolor=#| || bgcolor=#| || Cook Islands ||  ||  ||
|-
| Tomas ||  || bgcolor=#| || bgcolor=#| || bgcolor=#| || Wallis and Futuna, Fiji || ||  ||
|-
| Ului ||  || bgcolor=#| || bgcolor=#| || bgcolor=#| || Australia, Solomon IslandsVanuatu ||  ||  ||
|-
| Vania ||  || bgcolor=#| || bgcolor=#| || bgcolor=#| || New Caledonia, Vanuatu ||  ||  ||
|-
| Wilma ||  || bgcolor=#| || bgcolor=#| || bgcolor=#| || American Samoa, Fiji, SamoaTonga, New Zealand ||  ||  ||
|-
| Yasi ||  || bgcolor=#| || bgcolor=#| || bgcolor=#| || Australia, Fiji, Papua New GuineaSolomon Islands, Tuvalu, Vanuatu ||  ||  ||
|-
| Atu ||  || bgcolor=#| ||  bgcolor=#| || bgcolor=#| || New Caledonia, Vanuatu || Unknown ||  ||
|-
| Evan ||  || bgcolor=#| || bgcolor=#| || bgcolor=#| || Fiji, Samoa, American SamoaWallis and Futuna ||  ||  ||
|-
| Freda ||  || bgcolor=#| || bgcolor=#| || bgcolor=#| || Solomon Islands, New Caledonia || Unknown ||  ||
|-
| Ian ||  || bgcolor=#| || bgcolor=#| || bgcolor=#| || Fiji, Tonga ||  ||  ||
|-
| Lusi ||  || bgcolor=#| || bgcolor=#| || bgcolor=#| ||  Fiji, New CaledoniaNew Zealand, Vanuatu ||  ||  || 
|-
| Pam ||  || bgcolor=#| || bgcolor=#|  || bgcolor=#| || Fiji, Kiribati, New CaledoniaNew Zealand, Solomon IslandsTuvalu, Vanuatu ||  ||  ||
|-
| Ula ||  || bgcolor=#| || bgcolor=#| || bgcolor=#| || American Samoa, FijiNew Caledonia, Samoa, TongaTuvalu, Vanuatu || Unknown ||  ||
|-
| Winston ||  || bgcolor=#| || bgcolor=#| || bgcolor=#| || Fiji, Niue, Tonga, Vanuatu ||  ||  ||
|-
| Cook ||  || bgcolor=#| || bgcolor=#| || bgcolor=#||| Vanuatu, New Caledonia, New Zealand || Moderate ||  ||
|-
| Donna ||  || bgcolor=#| || bgcolor=#| || bgcolor=#| || Solomon Islands, Vanuatu, FijiNew Caledonia, New Zealand || Significant || 2 ||
|-
| Gita ||  || bgcolor=#| || bgcolor=#| || bgcolor=#| || Fiji, Wallis and Futuna, SamoaAmerican Samoa, Niue, TongaNew Caledonia, New Zealand ||  ||  ||
|-
| Josie ||  || bgcolor=#| || bgcolor=#| || bgcolor=#| || Vanuatu, Fiji, Tonga ||  || 6 || 
|-
| Keni ||  || bgcolor=#||| bgcolor=#| || bgcolor=#| || Vanuatu, Fiji, Tonga ||  || None || 
|-
| Pola ||  || bgcolor=#| || bgcolor=#| || bgcolor=#| || Wallis and Futuna, Fiji, Tonga || || ||
|-
| Sarai ||  || bgcolor=#| || bgcolor=#| || bgcolor=#| || Fiji, Tonga, Niue, Cook Islands||  || 2 || 
|-
| Tino ||  || bgcolor=#| || bgcolor=#| || bgcolor=#| || Fiji, Niue, Solomon IslandsSamoan Islands, Tonga, Tuvalu, Vanuatu || $5.83 million || ||
|-
| Yasa ||  || bgcolor=#| || bgcolor=#| || bgcolor=#| || Vanuatu, Fiji || $246.7 million || 4|| 
|-
| Ana || || bgcolor=#| || bgcolor=#| || bgcolor=#| || Fiji || >$1 million || 1 ||
|-
| Cody ||  || bgcolor=#| || bgcolor=#| || bgcolor=#| || Fiji || >$25 million || 1 ||
|-class="sortbottom"
! colspan=6| !! !! !!
|}

See also

List of retired tropical cyclone names
List of retired Atlantic hurricane names
List of retired Pacific hurricane names
List of retired Pacific typhoon names
List of retired Australian cyclone names

Notes

References

External links

Names South Pacific retired
Retired South Pacific cyclones
Tropical cyclones in Oceania